The Makonde are an ethnic group in southeast Tanzania, northern Mozambique, and Kenya. The Makonde developed their culture on the Mueda Plateau in Mozambique. At present they live throughout Tanzania and Mozambique, and have a small presence in Kenya. The Makonde population in Tanzania was estimated in 2001 to be 1,140,000, and the 1997 census in Mozambique put the Makonde population in that country at 233,358, for an estimated total of 1,373,358. The ethnic group is roughly divided by the Ruvuma River; members of the group in Tanzania are referred to as the Makonde, and those in Mozambique as the Maconde. The two groups have developed separate languages over time but share a common origin and culture.

History

The Makonde successfully resisted predation by African, Arab, and European slavers. They did not fall under colonial power until the 1920s. During the 1960s the revolution which drove the Portuguese out of Mozambique was launched from the Makonde homeland of the Mueda Plateau. For a time the revolutionary movement FRELIMO derived some of its financial support from the sale of Makonde carvings, and the group became the backbone of the revolutionary movement. The Maconde of Mozambique, due to their role in the resistance to Portuguese colonial rule, remain an influential group in the politics of the country.

They speak Makonde, also known as ChiMakonde, a Bantu language closely related to Yao. Many speak other languages such as English in Tanzania, Portuguese in Mozambique, and Swahili and Makua in both countries. The Makonde are traditionally a matrilineal society where children and inheritances belong to women, and husbands move into the village of their wives. Their traditional religion is an animistic form of ancestor worship and still continues, although Makonde of Tanzania are nominally Muslim and those of Mozambique are Catholic or Muslim. In Makonde rituals, when a girl becomes a woman, Muidini is the best dancer out of the group of girls undergoing the rituals.

The Makonde are best known for their wood carvings, primarily made of blackwood (Dalbergia melanoxylon, or mpingo), and their observances of puberty rites.

Kenyan citizenship
Some Makonde people from Mozambique had relocated to Kenya in the 1950s. Early in the 21st century efforts began to obtain Kenyan identity cards to allow the Makonde to exercise their rights and privileges as Kenyan citizens. In 2016, a group of 300 Makonde people trekked from Kwale to Nairobi. The group was led by Diana Gichengo an inclusions activist and accompanied by other human rights supportive stakeholders. They headed to the State House in Nairobi to persuade the President to push their recognition as Kenyan citizens. President Kenyatta gave them a warm welcome. After a well-prepared meal on Thursday 13 October 2016, the President ordered the relevant ministry to provide the Makonde with identity cards by December 2016.

Makonde art

The Makonde traditionally have carved wooden household objects, figures and masks for ritual use. After the 1930s, Makonde art has become an important part of the contemporary art of Africa. The most internationally acknowledged such artist was George Lilanga.

Notable Makonde people
 Benjamin Mkapa, third President of Tanzania
 George Lilanga, Tanzanian artist
 Filipe Nyusi, fourth President of Mozambique
 Major General Makame Nnalihinga Rashid, former Chief of National Service, Tanzania
 Reinata Sadimba, Mozambican artist
Harmonize, a famous musician from Tanzania. Founder of Kondegang
 Jaymoe, Tanzanian hip hop artist.

References

Further reading

External links
 Art Gallery
 Ntaluma's homepage
 Blog on Makonde culture

 
Ethnic groups in Mozambique
Ethnic groups in Tanzania
Indigenous peoples of East Africa